Qinglong Temple may refer to:

 Qinglong Temple (Xi'an), in Xi'an, Shaanxi, China
 Qinglong Temple (Jishan County), in Jishan County, Shanxi, China
 Main Hall of the Qinglong Temple, a major historical and cultural site in Lushan County, Sichuan
 A temple in Qingpu District, Shanghai; see Shanghai Rush

See also
 Qinglong (disambiguation)

Buddhist temple disambiguation pages